Leith Hill in southern England is the highest summit of the Greensand Ridge, approximately  southwest of Dorking, Surrey and  southwest of central London.

Four areas of woodland surrounding the hill comprise the  Leith Hill Site of Special Scientific Interest, although the summit is excluded from this designation.

The nearest railway station is Holmwood station,  to the east, served by Southern trains to London Victoria.

Leith Hill Tower

On the summit of Leith Hill is an 18th-century Gothic tower. A tower built contemporaneously at the summit of Bredon Hill achieves a similar purpose.

When Hull died in 1772, at his request he was buried under the tower. Following his death, the building was stripped of its contents, doors and windows, and fell into ruin. As a result, the tower was filled with rubble and concrete, and the entrance bricked up.

In 1864, William John Evelyn of nearby Wotton House decided to reopen it, but the concrete made this difficult, and so the additional turreted side-tower was added to allow access to the top of the tower.

At the top of the tower there is a viewpoint indicator to commemorate Walker Miles, whose work in the early days of the Rambler's movement contributed to the formation of The Ramblers of Great Britain. It has been claimed that on a clear day, 13 counties can be seen from the top of Leith Hill Tower.

The tower was fully restored by the National Trust in 1984. This restoration included the removal of rubble and concrete, fitting safety features such as a handrail in the narrow staircase, and converting the lower portion of the tower into a servery. Following restoration, the mobile phone operator Cellnet installed a first-generation transmitter station (Base site) into one of the tower rooms, feeding single vertical antennas on the tower roof dressed to look like flag poles.
Leith Hill Tower is open to the public every day from 10:00 am until 3:00 pm on weekdays and 9:00 am to 5:00 pm on weekends, every day of the year except Christmas Day, with a comprehensive display explaining the history of the tower.

History

Leith Hill was owned by the Evelyn family of Wotton House from the 17th to the early 20th centuries. On the death of Lt. John Evelyn in 1922, the executors of his will were required to raise money to pay death duties and they therefore offered the Tower and the surrounding five acres of Leith Hill for sale. After a campaign, organised in part by the Commons and Footpath Preservation Society, the land was bought by Wilfred James MacAndrew (a resident of Reigate and former co-owner of the shipping company MacAndrew & Co) and donated to the National Trust.

Leith Hill Place

Originally a gabled house dating from about 1600, Leith Hill Place was completely refaced in a Palladian style about 1760 by Richard Hull. It was bought in 1847 by Josiah Wedgwood III and remained in the family until his grandson, the composer Ralph Vaughan Williams, who had been brought up there and eventually inherited it from his brother, immediately gave it to the National Trust on his brother's death in 1944. Subsequently, it was leased from the Trust by his cousins Sir Ralph Wedgwood and then Sir John Wedgwood, later becoming a boarding house for a nearby sixth form college, Hurtwood House.

The house was opened to the public by the National Trust in 2013 and now serves as a memorial to Ralph Vaughan Williams. Josiah Wedgwood's widow, born Caroline Darwin, created a rhododendron wood there, now open to the public.

Geology

Like the other summits of the Greensand Ridge in the south of Surrey, the rock of which Leith Hill is composed, is primarily the Lower Greensand, overlaid with a harder layer of chert. The greensand was deposited in the early Cretaceous, most likely in a shallow sea with low oxygen levels. Over the subsequent 50 million years, other strata were deposited on top of the Lower Greensand, including Gault clay and the chalk of the North and South Downs.

Following the Cretaceous, the sea covering the south of England began to retreat and the land was pushed higher. The Weald (the area covering modern-day south Surrey, south Kent, north Sussex and east Hampshire) was lifted by the same geological processes that created the Alps, resulting in an anticline which stretched across the English Channel to the Artois region of northern France. Initially an island, this dome-like structure was drained by the ancestors of the rivers which today cut through the North and South Downs (including the Mole, Wey and Arun). The dome was eroded away over the course of the Cenozoic, exposing the strata beneath and resulting in the escarpments of the Downs and the Greensand Ridge.

Search for oil 
A site on an ancient lane going up the hill was originally chosen by an oil company for exploratory drilling, however due to an active protest campaign and various legal objections raised by local groups and environmentalists, the lease on the land from the Forestry Commission expired before the drilling could start. The Minister for Environment subsequently decided not to renew the lease due to concerns of the effect it would have on nearby ancient woodland. The oil company has since stated it intends to find a new site from which to explore the same prospect. Locals have stated that they will continue to oppose this.

Geodesy
Leith Hill Tower was the origin (meridian) of the 6 inch and 1:2500 Ordnance Survey maps of Surrey.

References

Notes

External links

 Leith Hill information at the National Trust
 Computer generated summit panoramas North South index

Hills of Surrey
Marilyns of England
National Trust properties in Surrey
Sites of Special Scientific Interest in Surrey
Towers in Surrey
Highest points of English counties
Mole Valley